Jeff P. Iorg (born October 9, 1958) is an American author, pastor, church planter, teacher, speaker, and current president of Gateway Seminary (formerly Golden Gate Baptist Theological Seminary), an entity of the Southern Baptist Convention with five campuses located in the Western United States.

Early life and education
Dr. Iorg was born in Forsyth, Georgia, and grew up in Abilene, Texas. He earned his B.A. (1980) from Hardin Simmons University, his M.Div (1984) from Midwestern Baptist Theological Seminary, and his D.Min. (1990) from Southwestern Baptist Theological Seminary. His DMin projected is titled "Developing Effective Listening Skills for Personal Evangelism."

Early career 
Iorg began his career in pastoral ministry, serving in both his home state of Texas as well as in Missouri before becoming founding pastor of one of the largest Southern Baptist churches of the Northwest, Greater Gresham Baptist Church in Gresham, Oregon. He joined the faculty of Golden Gate's Pacific Northwest Campus in 1990, where he has taught preaching, evangelism and leadership. Iorg was executive director-treasurer of the Northwest Baptist Convention from 1995 until 2004, when he was elected to succeed William O. Crews as president of Golden Gate Baptist Theological Seminary (Now Gateway Seminary of the Southern Baptist Convention).

Golden Gate to Gateway Seminary 
Since assuming the presidency at Gold Gate Seminary in 2004 Dr. Iorg reinstated the Ph.D. program under the direction of Dr. Richard Melick.". While the seminary was in Mill Valley he also served as the chaplain for the San Francisco Giants for 10 years. Significantly, Dr. Iorg facilitated the relocation and renaming of Golden Gate Seminary in Mill Valley, California into Gateway Seminary in Ontario, California. He personally recounts the story of the relocation in his book "Leading Major Change in Your Ministry" (2018).

Family life 
He is married to Ann, has five adult children, and five grandchildren. His hobbies include reading fiction, cheering on the Oregon Ducks, and searching for the world's best barbeque restaurant.

Views
In 2017, Iorg signed the Nashville Statement.

Publications
Iorg is the author of nine books:
 The Character of Leadership: Nine Qualities That Define Great Leaders (2007) 
 Is God Calling Me?: Answering the Question Every Leader Asks (2008) 
 The Painful Side of Leadership: Moving Forward Even When It Hurts (2009) 
 The Case for Antioch: A Biblical Model for a Transformational Church (2011) 
 Seasons of a Leader's Life: Learning, Leading, and Leaving a Legacy (2013) 
 Unscripted: Sharing the Gospel as Life Happens (2014) 
 Ministry in the New Marriage Culture (2015) 
 Leading Major Change in Your Ministry (2018) 
 Shadow Christians: Making an Impact When No One Knows Your Name (2020)

References

External links
 Jeff Iorg: Pastor, author, teacher, leader (GS faculty page)

Living people
1958 births
Seminary presidents
People from Forsyth, Georgia
Hardin–Simmons University alumni
Midwestern Baptist Theological Seminary alumni
Southwestern Baptist Theological Seminary alumni
People from Gresham, Oregon